Homochlorcyclizine (INN) is an antihistamine of the diphenylmethylpiperazine group which has been marketed in Japan since 1965. It is used in the treatment of allergies and other conditions. It also has some anticholinergic, antidopaminergic, and antiserotonergic properties.

See also 
 Chlorcyclizine

References 

H1 receptor antagonists
Chloroarenes
Diazepanes